Burcham could refer to:

Bob Burcham (1935–2009), American NASCAR driver
David W. Burcham (b. 1951), President of Loyola Marymount University
Margaret W. Burcham, US Army Corps of Engineers general
Milo Burcham (1903–44), American aviator
Rose La Monte Burcham (1859–1944), American medical doctor and mining executive
Scott Burcham (b. 1993), American-Israeli baseball player